Haleigh Meridian Washington (born September 22, 1995) is an American volleyball player of the United States women's national volleyball team. Washington was an All-American middle blocker for the Penn State women's volleyball team, where she helped lead the team to the 2014 NCAA national championship. 
Washington won gold with the national team at the 2020 Tokyo Summer Olympics.

Personal life

Washington was born in Denver, Colorado to parents Danielle and Alecs. In her early athletic days, she showed talent in basketball, but ended up being more passionate about volleyball while on the seventh-grade team. She would attend Clear Creek High School, where she began being recruited by college volleyball coaches in her freshman year. Her family relocated to Colorado Springs before her junior year, and she finished her high school career at Doherty High School, where she holds a state record after putting down 48 kills in a match with her high school team. 

She earned consecutive Colorado Volleyball Player of the Year honors in 2012 and 2013 and led her team to a state championship title in 2012, and was the 2013 Volleyball Magazine National Player of the Year. She was considered to be the nation's top high school recruit in her class, and ultimately decided to play collegiate volleyball at Penn State.

Washington has one brother, Kaden, and one sister, Leilani. In 2020, Washington came out as bisexual.

Penn State

Washington was a three-time first-team All-American and helped lead the team to the 2014 NCAA National Title as a freshman, as well as an appearance in the 2017 Final Four in her senior season. She was named the Big Ten Freshman of the Year after hitting .463 for the season. In her senior season, she earned the 2017 Big Ten Defensive Player of the Year, and led the nation with a .503 hitting percentage, while putting down 3.03 kills per set on the season. She earned AVCA All-American honors three times and was selected as a Honda Sports Award nominee after her senior season. 

Washington credited Penn State's head coach Russ Rose for acclimating her to the grueling demands and expectations of competing on the international stage.

Professional clubs

Washington has played in multiple Italian Series A1 professional volleyball teams, including Igor Gorgonzola Novara from 2020–2022. In the 2022–2023 season, plays with Savino Del Bene Scandicci.

United States national team

With Team USA, she started all three matches of the 2019 Tokyo Qualification Tournament in which Team USA earned its bid into the 2020 Olympic Games.

She was named to the 18-player roster of the 2021 FIVB Volleyball Women's Nations League. In her first match as the starting middle, had nine kills and a block against Brazil.

On June 7, 2021, US National Team head coach Karch Kiraly announced she would be part of the 12-player Olympic roster for the 2020 Summer Olympics in Tokyo. Washington helped lead her team to the USA's first ever gold medal and was named Best Middle Blocker of the tournament.

Awards and honors

International

2019 FIVB Nations League – "Best Middle Blocker"
2020 Summer Olympics – "Best Middle Blocker"

Professional clubs

2021–22 Italian Serie A1 League –  Bronze medal, with Novara
2021–22 Italian Cup (Coppa Italia) –  Silver medal, with Novara
2021–22 Italian Super Cup –  Silver medal, with Novara
2020–21 CEV Women's Champions League –  Bronze medal, with Novara
2020–21 Italian Cup (Coppa Italia) –  Silver medal, with Novara
2020–21 Italian Serie A1 League – Silver medal, with Novara
2020–21 Italian Super Cup –  Bronze medal, with Novara
2019–20 Italian Cup (Coppa Italia) –  Silver medal, with Busto

College
2014  NCAA Division I National Champions
2014 Big Ten Freshman of the Year
2014 Unanimous All-Big Ten Freshman Team
2014 NCAA Louisville Regional All-Tournament
2014 All-Big Ten
AVCA First Team All-American (2015, 2016, 2017)
Unanimous All-Big Ten selection (2015, 2016, 2017)
2015 B1G/Pac-12 Challenge Most Valuable Player
2016 CoSIDA Third-Team Academic All-America
2017 Senior CLASS Award winner in NCAA Division I volleyball
2017 Big Ten Defensive Player of the Year

See also
 List of Pennsylvania State University Olympians

References

1995 births
Living people
American women's volleyball players
Volleyball players at the 2020 Summer Olympics
Sportspeople from Denver
Penn State Nittany Lions women's volleyball players
Middle blockers
Expatriate volleyball players in Italy
American expatriate sportspeople in Italy
Pennsylvania State University alumni
Serie A1 (women's volleyball) players
Olympic gold medalists for the United States in volleyball
Medalists at the 2020 Summer Olympics
LGBT volleyball players
LGBT people from Colorado
LGBT African Americans
Bisexual sportspeople
Bisexual women
African-American volleyball players